The Accademia di San Luca (the "Academy of Saint Luke") is an Italian academy of artists in Rome. The establishment of the Accademia de i Pittori e Scultori di Roma was approved by papal brief in 1577, and in 1593 Federico Zuccari became its first principe or director; the statutes were ratified in 1607. Other founders included Girolamo Muziano and Pietro Olivieri. The Academy was named for Luke the Evangelist, the patron saint of painters.

From the late sixteenth century until it moved to its present location at the Palazzo Carpegna, it was based in an urban block by the Roman Forum and although these buildings no longer survive, the Academy church of Santi Luca e Martina, does. Designed by the Baroque architect, Pietro da Cortona, its main façade overlooks the Forum.

History 
The Academy's predecessor was the Compagnia di San Luca, a guild of painters and miniaturists, which had its statutes and privileges renewed at the much earlier date of 17 December 1478 by Pope Sixtus IV. Included among its founding members was the famous painter Melozzo da Forlì, as he was the pictor papalis in that period.

Over the early years, the papal authorities exerted a large degree of control over the leadership of the institution.

In 1605, Pope Paul V granted the Academy the right to pardon a condemned man on the feast of St. Luke. In the 1620s, Urban VIII extended its rights to decide who was considered an artist in Rome, and in 1627 it came under the patronage of his nephew, Cardinal Francesco Barberini. In 1633, Urban VIII gave it the right to tax all artists as well as art-dealers, and monopolize all public commissions. These latter measures raised strong opposition and apparently were poorly enforced.

At some after 1634, during the time when Pietro da Cortona was principe, the accademia began to admit architects, who enjoyed the same status as painters and sculptors.

The prìncipi (directors) of the institution have included some of the pre-eminent painters of the seventeenth century, including Domenichino, Bernini, Cortona and Romanelli.

The Cortona-Sacchi Debate and other artistic issues 
Artistic issues debated within the Academy included the Cortona-Sacchi controversy (see Andrea Sacchi for further details of this debate) about the number of figures in a painting. Disdain was expressed by many academicians for the Bamboccianti.

Giovanni Bellori gave famous lectures on painting in the Academy. In the early 18th century, the painter Marco Benefial was inducted, and then expelled for criticizing the academy as an insider.

Recent times 
Due to the construction of Via dell'Impero, the academy's historic headquarters on Via Bonella was demolished and in 1934 the institution moved to Palazzo Carpegna.

The Academy is still active; the Accademia Nazionale di San Luca is its modern descendant. From the very beginning, the statutes of the Academy directed that each candidate-academician was to donate a work of his art in perpetual memory and, later, a portrait. Thus the Academy, in its current premises in the 16th-century Palazzo Carpegna, located in the Piazza dell'Accademia di San Luca, has accumulated a unique collection of paintings and sculptures, including about 500 portraits, as well as an outstanding collection of drawings.

Principi 
Prominent artists to become Principe of the academy over the first 200 years include:

Claude Lorrain was a member but declined the offer of being Principe.
The Academy can also boast modern members, including sculptors Ernesto Biondi and Piccirilli Brothers.

References

External links

Art schools in Italy
Educational institutions established in the 1570s
Education in Rome
Culture in Rome
Renaissance Rome
1577 establishments in Italy
 
Learned societies of Italy
Rome R. II Trevi